Tereza Korvasová (born 29 June 1996) is a Czech racing cyclist, who currently rides for UCI Women's Continental Team .

Career
Prior to taking up cycling she was an accomplished distance runner at junior level, winning 13 championship titles in athletics. In 2014, Korvasová was fourth in the junior category in the European Mountain Running Championships, and helped the Czech Republic to the team bronze in the junior competition in the World Mountain Running Championships.

Korvasová took up cycle racing in 2015, initially alongside continuing her running career, using cycling as a form of cross-training. She initially competed in cycling for Sokol Louny. That year Korvasová also finished fourth in the junior competitions at the European Mountain Running Championships and the World Mountain Running Championships. She was also part of the Czech team that won the gold medal in the latter. Korvasová also enjoyed success in racewalking, becoming Czech junior champion in the 3 kilometres walk in 2015, competing in the junior category at the 2015 European Race Walking Cup and finishing 20th in the 10 kilometres race walk at the 2015 European Athletics Junior Championships.

In 2017, she joined . In June 2018 Korvasová won the Czech National Time Trial Championships, and the following month she won another gold medal in the time trial at the World University Cycling Championships. She rode in the women's time trial event at the 2018 UCI Road World Championships.

Personal life
Korvasová is a student at Masaryk University, specialising in Political Science and European Studies.

References

External links

1996 births
Living people
Czech female cyclists
Place of birth missing (living people)
Czech female long-distance runners
Czech female racewalkers